The 2005 Navy Midshipmen football team represented the United States Naval Academy (USNA) as an independent during the 2005 NCAA Division I-A football season. The team was led by fourth-year head coach Paul Johnson.

Schedule

References

Navy
Navy Midshipmen football seasons
Navy Midshipmen football